The Chaohu–Ma'anshan intercity railway is a high-speed railway in Anhui Province, China. The line is expected to be completed in 2026.

Stations

References

High-speed railway lines in China
High-speed railway lines under construction